This list of presidents of Bucknell University includes all who have led Bucknell University.

*Interim President
**Interim President from 1935–38

References

Bucknell University
Bucknell